Mlambo is a Zulu surname.

Notable people with this surname include:
 Ambuya Mlambo (1924–2008), Zimbabwean broadcaster
 Bernard Mlambo (born 1985), Zimbabwean cricketer
 Dunstan Mlambo (born c. 1960), South African judge
 Johnson Mlambo (born 1940), South African politician
 Lucas Mlambo (born 1959), Swazi painter
 Phumzile Mlambo-Ngcuka (born 1955), South African politician
 Sibongile Mlambo (born 1990), Zimbabwean actress
 Xolani Mlambo (born 1991), South African football player